

87001–87100 

|-id=088
| 87088 Joannewheeler || 2000 LY || Joanne Wheeler (born 1971) is a Member of the Order of the British Empire for her services to space. She is a leader in the space law discipline, and a fellow of the Royal Astronomical Society and Royal Aeronautical Society. She has drafted U.K. space law, supported the growth of space companies and briefed on asteroid exploration. || 
|-id=097
| 87097 Lomaki ||  || The Lomaki pueblo, one of smaller pueblos surrounding the main Wupatki pueblo (Wupatki National Monument) in northern  Arizona. Its ruins preserve clues to geologic history, ecological change and ancient human agricultural settlement. Lomaki pueblo was built on the edge of a canyon in the 1190s (List of Ancestral Puebloan dwellings in Arizona). || 
|}

87101–87200 

|-id=142
| 87142 Delsanti ||  || Audrey Delsanti (born 1976) is an associate professor at the University of Aix-Marseille (France) who studies the chemical composition and physical properties of small bodies across the solar system. || 
|}

87201–87300 

|-id=219
| 87219 Marcbernstein ||  || Marc Bernstein (born 1953) provided technical leadership and expertise for 32 years as a member of the MIT Lincoln Laboratory staff. This naming was on the occasion of his retirement as Associate Director and from the Lincoln Laboratory Steering Committee. || 
|-id=271
| 87271 Kokubunji ||  || Kokubunji, a city in Tokyo Metropolis, Japan. || 
|}

87301–87400 

|-id=312
| 87312 Akirasuzuki ||  || Akira Suzuki (born 1930) has developed a new research topic that is globally recognized as the Suzuki coupling reaction. It is for this achievement that he was awarded the Nobel Prize in Chemistry in 2010. || 
|}

87401–87500 

|-bgcolor=#f2f2f2
| colspan=4 align=center | 
|}

87501–87600 

|-bgcolor=#f2f2f2
| colspan=4 align=center | 
|}

87601–87700 

|-id=644
| 87644 Cathomen ||  || Rita Cathomen (born 1940) and her husband Ignaz (born 1934) live in Falera, Switzerland. In 1979, they learned about a possible megalithic menhir formation in Falera. After re-erecting 33 of 34 fallen menhirs, Ignaz provided guided tours during the summer until 2019. || 
|}

87701–87800 

|-bgcolor=#f2f2f2
| colspan=4 align=center | 
|}

87801–87900 

|-bgcolor=#f2f2f2
| colspan=4 align=center | 
|}

87901–88000 

|-id=954
| 87954 Tomkaye || 2000 TK || Tom Kaye (born 1957) is an American businessman and amateur astronomer. In March 2000, he collaborated with others to detect a previously discovered extrasolar planet Tau Boötis b around the star Tau Boötis using the doppler shift method with a 0.4-m telescope and home-built spectrograph. The name was suggested by Mark Trueblood. || 
|}

References 

087001-088000